Vitalia Stamat (born 6 January 2001) is a Moldovan tennis player.

Stamat has won three doubles titles on the ITF Women's Circuit. On 23 July 2018, she reached her best singles ranking of world No. 802. On 17 September 2018, she peaked at No. 589 in the doubles rankings.

Playing for Moldova at the Fed Cup, Stamat has a 6–1 win–loss record.

ITF Finals

Doubles (5–3)

ITF junior finals

Singles (0–1)

Doubles (2–3)

National representation

Fed Cup
Stamat made her Fed Cup debut for Moldova in 2016, while the team was competing in the Europe/Africa Zone Group III, when she was 15 years and 97 days old.

Fed Cup (6–1)

Singles (2–1)

Doubles (4–0)

References

External links
 
 
 

2001 births
Living people
Moldovan female tennis players